The 2012 National Finals Rodeo were held from December 6–15, 2012 in Paradise, Nevada with the exception of steer roping which was held in Guthrie, Oklahoma from November 2–3, 2012.  All events are sanctioned by the Professional Rodeo Cowboys Association with the exception of barrel racing which is sanctioned by the Women's Professional Rodeo Association.

References

External links
 http://www.prorodeo.com/series_home.aspx

Rodeos
Sports competitions in Las Vegas
National Finals Rodeo